This is a timeline of the Protestant Reformation in England. The list is not complete and you are welcome to expand it.

External links
 Timeline of the English Reformation and Development of the Anglican Church.

Protestant Reformation in England
English Reformation
English Reformation
Social history-related lists